Sahlbergotettix is a genus of true bugs belonging to the family Cicadellidae.

The species of this genus are found in Europe.

Species:
 Sahlbergotettix salicicola (Flor, 1861)

References

Cicadellidae
Hemiptera genera